Francis Edis Beaver (19 June 1824 – 7 October 1887) was an auctioneer and politician in colonial Victoria, a member of the Victorian Legislative Council and the Victorian Legislative Assembly at different times.

Early life
Beaver was born in Kennington, Surrey, England, the son of George Beaver and his wife Elizabeth, née Edis.

Colonial Australia
Beaver arrived in Sydney in 1833 and the Port Phillip District in 1840. In March 1854 Beaver was elected to the unicameral Victorian Legislative Council for Belfast and Warrnambool. Beaver held this position until the original Council was abolished in March 1856. He then was elected to the Victorian Legislative Assembly for Belfast in November 1856, holding the seat until August 1859. 
Beaver was again elected the Victorian Legislative Council, now the upper house of the Victorian Parliament, this time for North Yarra Province and held the seat from December 1882 until his death in Brighton, Victoria on 7 October 1887. Beaver had married Emily Stevens in 1845.

References

 

1824 births
1887 deaths
Members of the Victorian Legislative Council
Members of the Victorian Legislative Assembly
People from Surrey
English emigrants to colonial Australia
Australian auctioneers
19th-century Australian politicians
19th-century Australian businesspeople